Mixed Up may refer to:

 Mixed Up (The Cure album), 1990
 Mixed Up (Praga Khan album), 2001
 Mixed Up (I've Sound album), 2004

See also
Mix Up (disambiguation)